is a Japanese actor and voice actor. He worked at the Seinenza Theater Company in 1999, and currently works at Mausu Promotion. He is often typecast in either overweight or middle-aged roles in voice acting. He is the official Japanese dubbing voice for Scooby-Doo in the titular franchise, after Kazuo Kumakura.

Voice roles

Anime series
Baki the Grappler (Mitsunara Tokugawa)
Bleach: Thousand-Year Blood War (Ichibē Hyōsube)
Boruto: Naruto Next Generations (Shojoji)
Coyote Ragtime Show (Bank owner)
Demashita! Powerpuff Girls Z (Camera Monster, Himeko's father)
Doraemon (Donpa)
Fate/zero (Fionn mac Cumhaill)
Futari wa Pretty Cure Splash Star (Daisuke Hyūga)
Gallery Fake (Louis Basso)
Gate: Jieitai Kano Chi nite, Kaku Tatakaeri (Chinese President Dong Dechou)
Gegege no Kitaro (fifth series) (Yagyō-san)
Ghost Stories (High school principal)
Inuyasha (Tsubaki's master)
JoJo's Bizarre Adventure (Jack the Ripper)
JoJo's Bizarre Adventure: Diamond Is Unbreakable (Father Nijimura)
Kenichi: The Mightiest Disciple (Thor)
Kingdom (Renpa)
Konohana Kitan (Mouse Master (ep. 1, 11))
Legend of the Galactic Heroes: Die Neue These (Erlache)
One Piece (Jerry, Machvise)
Overlord II (Shasryu Shasha)
The Saga of Tanya the Evil (Heinrich Schreise)
SD Gundam World Heroes (Benjamin V2 Gundam)
Tide-Line Blue (King)
Trouble Chocolate (Macaroni)
Uninhabited Planet Survive! (Bell's father)
Natsume's Book of Friends Six (Senki (ep. 6))
Rokuhōdō Yotsuiro Biyori (Fumihiko Sakurada (ep. 7))

Original net animation
JoJo's Bizarre Adventure: Stone Ocean (Chocolate Shop Owner)
Kengan Ashura (Yōhei Bandō)

Tokusatsu
Kyukyu Sentai GoGo Five (Gluttonous Psyma Beast Juuki (ep. 13))
Tokusou Sentai Dekaranger (Toatlien Bunder (ep. 32 - 33、36))
Engine Sentai Go-onger (Water Pollution Machine Knight Uzumaquixote (ep. 25))
Samurai Sentai Shinkenger (Ayakashi Oborojime (ep. 46))

Video games
AI: The Somnium Files (So Sejima)
Bayonetta 3 (Phantasmaraneae)
Blaze Union: Story to Reach the Future (Alanjame, Norn)
Blue Dragon (Jiro's father)
Detroit Become Human (Zlatko)
Devil May Cry 5 (King Cerberus)
Dissidia Final Fantasy NT (ExDeath)
Fire Emblem
Fire Emblem Heroes (Walhart)
Fire Emblem Awakening (Walhart)
Fire Emblem: Three Houses (Nemesis)
Galaxy Angel series (Lezom Mer Zom)
God of War (Poseidon)
God of War II (Prometheus, Atlas)
Halo 2 (Chieftain Tartarus)
Lego Dimensions (Scooby-Doo)
Mana Khemia: Alchemists of Al-Revis (Bernhard Tieck)
Mighty No. 9 (Battalion)
Overwatch (Roadhog)
Ratchet: Deadlocked (Gleeman Vox)
Rogue Galaxy (Alekt Rosencaster, Lord Logan)
Skylanders: Spyro's Adventure (Stump Smash)
Skylanders: Giants (Stump Smash, Tree Rex)
Sly Cooper (Clockwerk)
Soulcalibur Legends (Geki)
Star Ocean: The Last Hope (Stephen D. Kenny)
Street Fighter
Street Fighter IV (Dudley)
Street Fighter X Tekken (Dudley)
Tales of Rebirth (Frantz)
Tales of the Abyss (Duke Fabre)
The Witcher 3: Wild Hunt (Baron)
To Heart 2 (Daniel)
Yakuza
Yakuza (Futoshi Shimano, Tobe)
Yakuza 2 (Futoshi Shimano, Tobe)
Yakuza 5 (Youtarou Nakajima)
Yakuza Kiwami (Futoshi Shimano)
Yakuza 0 (Futoshi Shimano)

Dubbing roles

Live-action
John Goodman
Trouble with the Curve (Pete Klein)
Flight (Harling Mays)
The Internship (Sammy Boscoe)
The Monuments Men (Sgt. Walter Garfield)
Transformers: Age of Extinction (Hound)
The Gambler (Frank)
Patriots Day (Ed Davis)
Transformers: The Last Knight (Hound)
Atomic Blonde (Emmett Kurzfeld)
Valerian and the City of a Thousand Planets (Igon Siruss)
Dave Bautista
Guardians of the Galaxy (Drax the Destroyer)
Guardians of the Galaxy Vol. 2 (Drax the Destroyer)
Bushwick (Stupe)
Avengers: Infinity War (Drax the Destroyer)
Avengers: Endgame (Drax the Destroyer)
Thor: Love and Thunder (Drax the Destroyer)
The Guardians of the Galaxy Holiday Special (Drax the Destroyer)
Guardians of the Galaxy Vol. 3 (Drax the Destroyer)
13 (Ronald Lynn Bagges (Ray Winstone))
27 Dresses (Hal Nichols (Brian Kerwin))
Absolutely Anything (Chief Alien (John Cleese))
The Amazing Spider-Man 2 (Aleksei Sytsevich (Paul Giamatti))
The Art of War II: Betrayal (Sallas)
Audrey (Andrew Wald)
Avatar: The Way of Water (Captain Mick Scoresby (Brendan Cowell))
Back to the Future Part III (2018 BS Japan edition) (Levi (Dub Taylor))
Batman Begins (2008 Fuji TV edition) (Carmine Falcone (Tom Wilkinson))
Black Nativity (Reverend Cornell Cobbs (Forest Whitaker))
Candyman: Day of the Dead (L.V. Sacco (Robert O'Reilly))
Cellular (2007 TV Asahi edition) (Mad Dog)
The Count of Monte Cristo (Jacopo (Luis Guzmán))
The Dark Knight (2012 TV Asahi edition) (Michael Wuertz (Ron Dean))
Dark Shadows (Joshua Collins (Ivan Kaye))
Dr. Strangelove (Colonel "Bat" Guano (Keenan Wynn))
Draft Day (Anthony Molina (Frank Langella))
Eagle Eye (George Callister (Michael Chiklis))
Everwood (Irv Harper (John Beasley))
The Experiment (Michael Barris (Forest Whitaker))
Fences (Jim Bono (Stephen Henderson))
First Reformed (Pastor Joel Jeffers (Cedric Kyles))
The Fourth Kind (Awolowa Odusami (Hakeem Kae-Kazim))
Frank Herbert's Dune (Duke Leto Atreides (William Hurt))
The Fresh Prince of Bel-Air (Philip Banks (James Avery))
Get Smart (Larabee (David Koechner))
Get Smart (2011 TV Asahi edition) (Secret Service Agent Driver (Matthew Glave))
Godzilla (Stan Walsh (Garry Chalk))
Grace of Monaco (Father Francis Tucker (Frank Langella))
Gun Shy (Fulvio Nesstra (Oliver Platt))
Harper's Island (Sheriff Charlie Mills (Jim Beaver))
Harry Potter series (Uncle Vernon Dursley (Richard Griffiths))
Hart's War (Staff Sergeant Vic W. Bedford (Cole Hauser))
High School Musical 3: Senior Year (Coach Kellogg)
I, Robot (Lieutenant John Bergin (Chi McBride))
Imagine That (Johnny Whitefeather (Thomas Haden Church))
The Island (Starkweather Two Delta/Jamil "The Juggernaut" Starkweather (Michael Clarke Duncan))
John Carter (Tardos Mors (Ciarán Hinds))
The Judge (Glen Palmer (Vincent D'Onofrio))
Jurassic Park III (Enrique Cardoso (Julio Oscar Mechoso))
The Living Daylights (2006 DVD edition) (Brad Whitaker (Joe Don Baker))
The Magnificent Seven (Jack Horne (Vincent D'Onofrio))
Mission: Impossible 2 (2006 TV Asahi edition) (John C. McCloy (Brendan Gleeson))
Mulan (Sergeant Qiang (Ron Yuan))
The Number 23 (Doctor Sirius Leary (Bud Cort))
Once Upon a Time in Mexico (Jorge Ramirez (Rubén Blades))
Only the Brave (Duane Steinbrink (Jeff Bridges))
Oz (Lenny, Burrano, Seamus O'Reily (Kevin Conway))
Paddington 2 (Knuckles McGinty (Brendan Gleeson))
Pecker (Mister Nellbox)
Pinocchio (Stromboli (Giuseppe Battiston))
Piranha 3DD (Deputy Fallon (Ving Rhames))
Planet of the Apes (Krull (Cary-Hiroyuki Tagawa))
Platoon (2003 TV Tokyo edition) (King (Keith David))
Ra.One (Barron (Dalip Tahil))
Red Dwarf (Captain Herring (Stephen Critchlow))
Risen (Peter (Stewart Scudamore))
The Rock (1999 NTV edition) (Seal Reigert (Marshall Teague))
The Rock (2000 TV Asahi edition) (Captain Darrow (Tony Todd))
Roman Holiday (PDDVD edition) (Mario Delani (Paolo Carlini))
The Scorpion King (Jesup (Branscombe Richmond))
Shark Lake (Sheriff Lewis Galloway (Lance E. Nichols))
Shinjuku Incident (Uncle Tak (Paul Chun))
Skylines (Grant (James Cosmo))
Spy Kids (Felix (Cheech Marin))
Spy Kids 2: The Island of Lost Dreams (Felix (Cheech Marin))
Spy Kids 3-D: Game Over (Felix (Cheech Marin))
The Spy Next Door (Glaze (George Lopez))
Star Trek: Enterprise (Silik (John Fleck))
Super 8 (Dr. Thomas Woodward (Glynn Turman))
The Thing About Pam (Narrator (Keith Morrison))
Third Watch (John 'Sully' Sullivan (Skipp Sudduth))
True Detective (Major Ken Quesada (Kevin Dunn))
A View to a Kill (2006 DVD edition) (Sir Godfrey Tibbett (Patrick Macnee))
The Virgin Suicides (Dr. E. M. Horniker (Danny DeVito))
We're the Millers (Don Fitzgerald (Nick Offerman))
Wind River (Martin Hanson (Gil Birmingham))
Windtalkers (Private Charlie Whitehouse)
X-Men: Days of Future Past (Richard Nixon (Mark Camacho))
Y Tu Mamá También (Esteban Morelos)
Zack Snyder's Justice League (Silas Stone (Joe Morton))

Animation
The 7D (Happy)
Angela Anaconda (Astronaut Bob)
Barbie as Rapunzel (Hugo the Dragon)
Barbie as the Princess and the Pauper (Herve and Minister)
Barbie and the Magic of Pegasus (King)
The Batman (Cluemaster)
Batman Beyond: Return of the Joker (Tim Drake)
Batman: The Brave and the Bold (Scooby-Doo)
Ben 10 (Doctor Vicktor)
Bionicle 2: Legends of Metru Nui (Whenua)
Cars (Peterbilt)
Cars 3 (Tex)
The Emperor's New Groove (Pacha)
The Emperor's New School (Pacha)
Fantastic Four (The Thing)
Finding Nemo (Pearl's Father)
The Grim Adventures of Billy & Mandy (Scooby-Doo)
Home (Captain Smek)
Jackie Chan Adventures (Tohru)
Johnny Bravo (Scooby-Doo)
A Kind of Magic (Gregore)
Kronk's New Groove (Pacha)
Kung Fu Panda 2 (Panda Dad)
Monsters, Inc. (trailer) (James P. "Sulley" Sullivan)
Ned's Newt (Newton)
Open Season 2 (Boog)
Open Season 3 (Boog)
Penguins of Madagascar (Dave / Dr. Octavius Brine)
Pinky and the Brain (Snowball, Robin Hood, others)
The Pirates Who Don't Do Anything: A VeggieTales Movie (Robert the Terrible)
Ralph Breaks the Internet (Butcher Boy)
Scoob! (Scooby-Doo)
Scooby-Doo, Where Are You! (Scooby-Doo) (Cartoon Network Japan dub)
Scooby-Doo and Scrappy-Doo (Scooby-Doo) (Cartoon Network Japan dub)
Scooby-Doo on Zombie Island (Scooby-Doo)
Scooby-Doo! and the Witch's Ghost (Scooby-Doo)
Scooby-Doo and the Alien Invaders (Scooby-Doo)
Scooby-Doo and the Cyber Chase (Scooby-Doo)
Shirt Tales (Clarence from "Horsin' Around")
Teen Titans (Trident)
The Twisted Tales of Felix the Cat (Mister Cylinder)
Yogi Bear (Yogi Bear)
Up (Tom the Construction Worker)

Other
Kill Bill (Boss Matsumoto (voice))
Tokyo DisneySea's Raging Spirits (Narrator)

References

External links

1954 births
Living people
Japanese male stage actors
Japanese male video game actors
Japanese male voice actors
Male voice actors from Fukuoka Prefecture
Mausu Promotion voice actors
20th-century Japanese male actors
21st-century Japanese male actors